Raili Sallinen (born 30 July 1938) is a Finnish ski orienteering competitor. At the first World Ski Orienteering Championships in 1975 held in Finland she won a gold medal with the Finnish relay team, together with Aila Flöjt and Sinikka Kukkonen, and placed fifth in the individual contest.

Her son is Kari Sallinen.

See also
 Finnish orienteers
 List of orienteers
 List of orienteering events

References

Finnish orienteers
Female orienteers
Ski-orienteers
Living people
1938 births